Orca is a fantasy novel by American writer Steven Brust, the seventh book in his Vlad Taltos series, set in the fantasy world of Dragaera. Originally published in 1996 by Ace Books, it was republished in 2003 along with Athyra in the omnibus The Book of Athyra. Following the trend of the Vlad Taltos books, it is named after one of the Great Houses and features that House as an important element to its plot.

Plot introduction
Vlad and his friend Kiera the Thief investigate a financial cover-up following the mysterious death of an Orca tycoon.

Plot summary

Reunions
Kiera the Thief sends a letter to Vlad's estranged wife Cawti, offering to meet and tell her of Vlad's most recent adventures. In return for not telling Vlad some of Cawti's secrets, Kiera insists on making some omissions from her story. The rest of the novel is Kiera's story, seemingly without the omissions she makes to Cawti.

Vlad contacts Kiera from the city of Northport and asks her a favor: break into the mansion of the late Orca businessman Fyres and take any documents she can find. She agrees if he will explain why. He tells her that he went to Northport to find a healer for Savn, a Teckla boy whose mind was damaged during the events of Athyra. A local healer, whom Vlad calls "Mother" because he cannot pronounce her name, agrees to help Savn if Vlad will help fix her problem: she's being evicted from her cottage. Vlad navigates through a labyrinth of business records to discover that Mother's land is ultimately owned by Fyres, who only a week ago died on his yacht.

Investigations
Kiera agrees to help Vlad and performs the burglary. She then goes to her local Jhereg contact in the Organization, Stony, and pumps him for information. He tells her that Fyres's empire was an illusion of loans and deception. Further, his death has devastated a number of businesses, banks, and even some Jhereg crime syndicates, causing most to fold. The closing of banks has ruined many private citizens, including Mother.

Vlad becomes suspicious of the quick Imperial investigation that judged Fyres's death an accident. He disguises himself as a Dragaeran and begins questioning Fyres's relatives and the Imperial investigators. He quickly determines that a cover-up is underway by at least one covert Imperial agency. Kiera conducts several burglaries and determines that the Empire's Minister of the Treasury is also involved. During these investigations, Mother makes progress with Savn, who begins to respond more to people around him.

Conspiracies
Vlad and Kiera's investigations bring them notice from the conspirators, including Vonnith, who was responsible for closing Mother's bank. With Vonnith's help, Vlad is ambushed by Stony, who has learned Vlad's true identity as an infamous fugitive from the Jhereg Organization's assassins. With the help of Loiosh, Vlad kills Stony and escapes.  Vlad and Kiera use these events to put the pieces into place: Fyres was assassinated by the Jhereg out of revenge, and his death has allowed a small group of conspirators to profit greatly while the government covers up the assassination to maintain the financial stability of the entire Empire.

Vlad lays out the scope of the conspiracy before one of the Imperial agents, whose boss had been killed by one of the conspirators. In return for Vlad killing the architect of her boss's assassination, the agent agrees to get the deed to Mother's house from Vonnith. With those exceptions, the conspiracy will be allowed to succeed. Jhereg loans will protect most citizens from total bankruptcy, and the market will survive.

Secrets
With everything sorted out, Kiera confronts Vlad about several of his actions during the course of the investigation and Vlad admits that he knows a secret about Kiera. Citing several instances when Kiera's speaking patterns changed and she displayed more knowledge of arcane military history than would be expected, Vlad reveals that Kiera is in fact an alternate identity of Sethra Lavode, the most powerful sorceress in the world. Kiera admits the truth, but takes comfort in the fact that only Vlad has had the ability to discover her secret, since he's the only person who knows both Sethra and Kiera.

One of Kiera's omissions in her tale to Cawti appears to be this final revelation. Some time after the end of her tale, Kiera sends another letter to Cawti, sending her best wishes. She also compliments Cawti's young child, Vlad Norathar, whose existence is apparently one of Cawti's secrets.

Trivia and Allusions
 This is the first Vlad novel to feature a first-person narrative from a character other than Vlad.
 Vlad's alias, "Padraic" is the seldom-used given name of Kelly, the leader of the group of revolutionists Cawti joined in Teckla.

The House of the Orca
The Orca are naturally inclined to seafaring, and thus are also natural traders and merchants. Orca make up a majority of the Imperial Navy. Those that live inland channel their talents into banking and business. Orca are known for their ruthlessness. Many young urban Orca form gangs that abuse Teckla and Easterners. Adult Orca are often hired as temporary thugs. Even Orca businessman are ruthless in their business practices. Although a noble House, the Orca are low on the scale of aristocracy. Wealthy Orca often become obsessed with rank and titles, though Orca titles have no land associated with them. The House will demote or promote its members to ensure that sailors never take orders from someone with an equal or lower title than themselves. The House colors are blue and green. Orca generally have stocky builds, light hair and eyes, and nearly invisible eyebrows.

The House is named after the orca, a vicious sea predator that somewhat resembles the real world orca. It represents the Orca's ruthlessness and aquatic tendencies.

1996 American novels
Dragaera
1996 fantasy novels
Ace Books books
Novels by Steven Brust